Lac d'Aiguebelette is a natural lake in the commune of Aiguebelette-le-Lac, within the department of Savoie, France.

Geography

Description
With a surface area of 5.45 km2 and a depth of 71 meters it is one of the largest natural lakes of France. It is noted for its blue-green colour and the seven hot water springs. The communities of Novalaise, Lépin-le-Lac, Saint-Alban-de-Montbel and Aiguebelette-le-Lac border west side of the lake, whilst the Chaîne de l'Épine ridge lies to the east with its high point at Mont Grêle.

At the southern end there are two islands, La Petite Ile and La Grande Ile which has a chapel.

Climate

Lake Aiguebelette has a oceanic climate (Köppen climate classification Cfb) closely bordering on a humid subtropical climate (Cfa).

Recreation
The Chaîne de l'Épine ridge is crossed by hiking trails, and paragliders launch from there during the summer.

Motorboats are not allowed on the lake to preserve the silence and wildlife along the lake. There are noted views of the lake from the church at St. Alban de Montbel and the mountain ridges.

Rowing
The lake hosted the 1997 and 2015 World Rowing Championships.

References

External links

 Lac Aiguebelette website

Aiguebelette
Rowing venues
Aiguebelette